Frédéric Dupetit-Méré (16 September 1785 – 4 July 1827), was a French playwright and dramatist.

Dupetit-Méré, alone and in collaboration with Ducange, Michel-Nicolas Balisson de Rougemont, Nicolas Brazier and others, wrote many plays, historical and heroical melodramas, vaudevilles and féeries, almost all of them published under the name "Frédéric".

Theatre 

 Le Vieux Poète, vaudeville in 1 act, Paris, 16 November 1804.
 L’Amant rival, comédie en vaudevilles, en 1 acte, with Pelletier, Paris, Théâtre des Jeunes-Artistes, 19 May 1805.
 La Femme à trois visages, ou les Condottiéris, melodrama in 3 acts, with Eugène Cantiran de Boirie, Paris, Théâtre de l'Ambigu-Comique, 9 October 1805.
 Le Vainqueur d’Austerlitz, ou le Retour du héros, entertainment extravaganza, with Pelletier, Paris, Théâtre de Molière, 2 February 1806.
 La Famille vénitienne, ou le Château d’Orsenno, melodrama in 3 acts, extravaganza, Paris, Théâtre des Jeunes-Artistes, 7 May 1806.
 M. Rikiki, ou le Voyage à Sceaux, vaudeville in 1 act, with Roset, Paris, Théâtre des Jeunes-Artistes, 24 May 1806.
 Le Génie des isles noires, ou Quiribirini, melodrama féerie in 3 acts, extravaganza, Paris, Nouveaux-Troubadours, 10 July 1806.
 La Forêt d’Edimbourg, ou les Écossais, melodrama in 3 acts, Paris, Théâtre de la Gaîté, 6 August 1806.
 La Chaumière du Mont-Jura, ou les Bûcherons suisses, melodrama in 3 acts, in prose and with extravaganza, Paris, Théâtre de la Gaîté, 27 August 1806.
 L’Aveugle du Tyrol, melodrama in 3 acts, extravaganza, Paris, Théâtre de la Gaîté, 16 March 1807.
 Les Petits Troubadours, melodrama in 3 acts, extravaganza, mingled with song, Paris, Théâtre des Nouveaux-Troubadours, 28 July 1807.
 La Queue de lapin, melodrama-arlequinade-féerie-comique in 3 acts, extravaganza, Paris, Théâtre de la Gaîté, 21 November 1807.
 La Famille des jobards, ou les Trois cousins, vaudeville in 1 act, with Eugène Cantiran de Boirie, Paris, Théâtre de la Gaîté, 9 May 1808.
 La Bataille de Pultassa, historical melodrama in 3 acts, with Eugène Cantiran de Boirie, Paris, Théâtre de l’Ambigu-Comique, 1 September 1808.
 La Famille des malins, vaudeville grivois in 1 act, with Nicolas Brazier, Paris, Théâtre de la Gaîté, 15 December 1808.
 L’Homme de la Forêt noire, melodrama in 3 acts, extravaganza, with Eugène Cantiran de Boirie, Paris, Théâtre de la Gaîté, 16 March 1809.
 Les Albinos vivants, folie in 1 act, Paris, Théâtre de la Gaîté, 9 May 1809.
 L’Isle des mariages, ou les Filles en loterie, comical melodrama in 3 acts, extravaganza, with Alexandre Bernos, Paris, Théâtre de la Gaîté, 22 November 1809.
 Le Lion de Florence, ou l’Héroïsme maternel, historical tableaux in two actions, Paris, Théâtre de la Salle des Jeux-Gymniques, 28 February 1810.
 La Tête rouge, ou le Mandrin du Nord, historical tableaux in two actions and extravaganza, with a prologue in prose, Paris, Théâtre de la Salle des Jeux-Gymniques, 15 May 1810.
 Soubakoff, ou la Révolte des Cosaques, scènes pantomimes équestres in 3 parts, extravaganza, Paris, Cirque-Olympique, 9 June 1810.
 La Roche du diable, scènes-féeries dans le genre italien, in 3 parts and extravaganza, Paris, Théâtre des Jeux-Forains, 23 October 1810.
 Le Sabot miraculeux, ou l’Île des nains, scènes-féeries in 3 parts, extravaganza, Paris, Théâtre des Jeux-Forains, 8 January 1811.
 Le Grand Justicier, ou la Conjuration aragonaise, melodrama in 3 acts, Paris, Théâtre de la Gaîté, 12 March 1811.
 Les Cosaques, ou le Fort du Niéper, tableaux in 3 actions, extravaganza, Paris, Théâtre de la Salle des Jeux-Gymniques, 13 May 1811.
 Le Petit Poucet, ou l’Ogre de la montagne de fer, tale by Charles Perrault set in motion, scenes in 3 parts, Paris, Théâtre des Jeux-Forains, 20 July 1811.
 La Fille-tambour, scene in 3 parts, extravaganza, with Pierre-Joseph Charrin, Paris, Théâtre Montansier, 1 October 1811.
 Le Berceau d’Arlequin, jeux florains in 50 scenes, Paris, Théâtre des Jeux-Forains, 10 February 1812.
 Le Maréchal de Luxembourg, melodrama in 3 acts, extravaganza, with Eugène Cantiran de Boirie, Paris, Théâtre de la Gaîté, 26 September 1812.
 Les Bédouins, ou la Tribu du Mont-Liban, pantomime in 3 acts, extravaganza, Paris, Cirque-Olympique, 10 April 1813.
 Le Fils banni, melodrama in 3 acts and extravaganza, Paris, Théâtre de l’Ambigu-Comique, 12 January 1815.
 Le Pic terrible, ou la Pauvre mère, pantomime in 3 acts, Paris, Cirque-Olympique, 26 April 1815.
 Jean-Bart, ou le Voyage en Pologne, melodrama in 3 acts, extravaganza, music by Louis Alexandre Piccinni, Paris, Théâtre de la Porte-Saint-Martin, 5 August 1815.
 La Grotte de Fingal, ou le Soldat mystérieux, extravaganza melodrama, in 3 acts, with Aimé Desprez, music by Alexandre Piccinni, Paris, Théâtre de la Porte Saint-Martin, 30 September 1815.
 La Famille d’Anglade, ou le Vol, melodrama in 3 acts, extravaganza, from causes célèbres, with Fournier, Paris, Théâtre de la Porte Saint-Martin, 11 January 1816.
 La Vallée du torrent, ou l’Orphelin et le meurtrier, melodrama in 3 acts, extravaganza, Paris, Théâtre de la Porte Saint-Martin, 29 May 1816.
 Aureng-Zeb, ou la Famille indienne, melodrama in 3 acts, music by Louis Alexandre Piccinni, Paris, Théâtre de la Porte Saint-Martin, 27 February 1817.
 Daniel, ou la Fosse aux lions, pantomime in dialogue in 3 acts extravaganza, Paris, Théâtre de la Porte Saint-Martin, 9 July 1817.
 La Brouille et le raccommodement, comedy en 1 act, mingled with vaudevilles, Paris, Théâtre de la Porte Saint-Martin, 13 November 1817.
 Le Maréchal de Villars, ou la Bataille de Denain, historical melodrama in 3 acts, extravaganza, with Jean-Jacques Duperche, Paris, Théâtre de la Porte Saint-Martin, 27 November 1817.
 Le Petit Chaperon Rouge, mélodrame-féerie in 3 acts, in prose, with Nicolas Brazier, Paris, Théâtre de la Porte Saint-Martin, 28 February 1818.
 La Cabane de Montainard, ou les Auvergnats, melodrama in 3 acts extravaganza, Victor Ducange, Paris, Théâtre de la Porte Saint-Martin, 26 September 1818.
 Sbogar, comedy in 1 act, mingled with couplets, with Michel-Nicolas Balisson de Rougemont and Eugène Cantiran de Boirie, Paris, Théâtre des Variétés, 26 December 1818.
 Le Garçon d’honneur, imitation de la Fille d’honneur, in 1 act and vaudevilles, Paris, Théâtre de la Porte Saint-Martin, 13 February 1819.
 Lolotte et Fanfan, ou les Flibustiers, pantomime in 3 acts, Paris, 19 March 1819.
 Le Banc de sable, ou les Naufragés français, melodrama in 3 acts, in prose extravaganza, with Eugène Cantiran de Boirie and Jean-Toussaint Merle, Paris, Théâtre de la Porte Saint-Martin, 14 April 1819.
 Le Mineur d’Aubervald, melodrama in 3 acts, in prose extravaganza, with Victor Ducange, Paris, Théâtre de l’Ambigu-Comique, 25 April 1820.
 La Famille Sirven, ou Voltaire à Castres, with Jean-Baptiste Dubois, Paris, Théâtre de la Gaîté, 27 June 1820 Text on line.
 Fanfan la Tulipe, ou En avant ! one-act play, mingled with vaudevilles, with Jean-Baptiste Dubois, Paris, Théâtre de la Gaîté, 1 August 1820.
 M. Duquignon, comedy in 1 act, mingled with couplets, with Benjamin Antier, Paris, Théâtre de la Porte Saint-Martin, 16 January 1821.
 Ismayl et Maryam, ou l’Arabe et la chrétienne, play in 3 acts, extravaganza, with Bon Taylor, Paris, Panorama-Dramatique, 14 April 1821.
 La Sorcière, ou l’Orphelin écossais, melodrama in 3 acts and in prose, from Walter Scott, with Victor Ducange, Paris, Théâtre de la Gaîté, 3 May 1821.
 Anne de Boulen, melodrama in 3 acts, with Michel-Nicolas Balisson de Rougemont, Paris, Théâtre de l’Ambigu-Comique, 8 May 1821.
 Le Bureau des nourrices, foly in 1 act, mingled with couplets, with Gabriel-Alexandre Belle, Paris, Théâtre de la Gaîté, 16 February 1822.
 Paoli, ou les Corses et les Génois, melodrama in 3 acts, extravaganza, with Auguste Le Poitevin de L'Égreville, Paris, Théâtre de la Gaîté, 26 March 1822.
 La Fausse Clef, ou les Deux fils, melodrama in 3 acts, with Jean-Baptiste Pellissier, Paris, Théâtre de la Gaîté, 22 January 1823.
 Barbe-bleue, folie-féerie in 2 acts, preceded by Un coup de baguette, prologue in 1 act, with Nicolas Brazier, Paris, Théâtre de la Gaîté, 24 May 1823.
 Le Mauvais sujet, comedy in 1 act, mingled with couplets, from the novel by Léonide, with Edmond Crosnier, Paris, Théâtre de la Porte Saint-Martin, 4 March 1824.
 Minuit, ou la Révélation, melodrama in 3 acts, extravaganza, with Edmond Crosnier, Paris, Théâtre de la Gaîté, 10 Juna 1824.
 Le Mulâtre et l’Africaine, melodrama in 3 acts, extravaganza, with Jean-Baptiste Pellissier, Paris, Théâtre de la Gaîté, 14 September 1824.
 L’Étrangère, melodrama in 3 acts, from the novel by Charles-Victor Prévot, vicomte d'Arlincourt, with Edmond Crosnier, Paris, Théâtre de la Gaîté, 26 April 1825.
 Sapajou, ou le Naufrage des singes, folie in 2 acts, mingled with pantomime and dance, Paris, Théâtre de la Gaîté, 3 August 1825.
 Le Chemin creux, melodrama in 3 acts, extravaganza, with Auguste Lepoitevin de L'Égreville and Henry Mourier, Paris, Théâtre de la Gaîté, 22 November 1825.
 Le Moulin des étangs, melodrama in 4 acts, with Jean-Baptiste Pellissier, Paris, Théâtre de la Gaîté, 28 January 1826.
 Louise, drama in 3 acts and in prose, with Edmond Crosnier, Paris, Théâtre de l'Odéon, 17 February 1827.

References

Sources 
 Gustave Vapereau, Dictionnaire universel des littératures, Paris, Hachette, 1876, (p. 678).

19th-century French dramatists and playwrights
Writers from Paris
1785 births
1827 deaths